Pustularia mauiensis is a species of sea snail, a cowry, a marine gastropod mollusk in the family Cypraeidae, the cowries.

Subspecies  
 Pustularia mauiensis mauiensis (Burgess, 1967)
Pustularia mauiensis wattsi Lorenz, 2000- occurs off Hawaii.

Description
The length of the shell attains 11.6 mm.

Distribution

References

 Lorenz, F., 2000. A new subspecies of Pustularia mauiensis (Burgess, 1967). La Conchiglia 296: 19–22
 Lorenz F. (2014). Monograph of the genus Pustularia (Gastropoda: Cypraeidae). Harxheim: ConchBooks. 130 pp

Cypraeidae
Gastropods described in 1967